This list includes people with given names Ben and Benjamin.

Benjamin Edwards may refer to:
 Benjamin Edwards (artist) (born 1970), American visual artist and writer
 Benjamin Edwards (Maryland politician) (1753–1829), American merchant and politician
 Benjamin Edwards (stockbroker) (1931–2009), American stockbroker
 Benjamin S. Edwards (1818–1886), American lawyer and judge
 Benjamin W. Edwards (c. 1780–1837), American colonist

Ben Edwards may refer to:
 Ben Edwards (American football) (born 1992), American football wide receiver
 Ben Edwards (commentator) (born 1965), British motor racing commentator
 Ben Edwards (kickboxer) (born 1985), Australian boxer and mixed martial arts fighter
 Ben Edwards (music publisher) (c. 1884–1954), German-born American music publisher and talent agent
 Ben Charles Edwards (active since 2008), British film director, producer and writer

Fictional characters
 Ben Edwards (Baywatch) (appearing 1991 to 1994), fictional character from the TV series, Baywatch